Sutter's Gold is a 1936 American Western film. It is a fictionalized version of the aftermath of the discovery of gold on Sutter's property, spurring the California Gold Rush of 1849. Edward Arnold plays John Sutter. The supporting cast includes Lee Tracy, Binnie Barnes, Katherine Alexander, Montagu Love, and Harry Carey as Kit Carson. The film was directed by James Cruze.

Cast
Edward Arnold as John Sutter
Lee Tracy as Pete Perkin
Binnie Barnes as Countess Elizabeth Bartoffski
Katharine Alexander as Anna Sutter
Montagu Love as Capt. Kettleson
Addison Richards as James Marshall
John Miljan as Gen. Juan Bautista Alvarado
Harry Carey as Kit Carson
William Janney as John Sutter, Jr.
Nan Grey as Ann Eliza Sutter
Robert Warwick as Gen. Alexander Rotscheff
Morgan Wallace as General Fremont
Allen Vincent as Juan Bautista Alvarado, Jr.
Mitchell Lewis as King Kamehameha
Harry Cording as Seaman Lars (uncredited)
George Irving as Dr. Billings (uncredited)

See also 
 Der Kaiser von Kalifornien (1936) film

References

External links
 
 Sutter's Gold at IMDB

1936 films
Universal Pictures films
Films directed by James Cruze
American historical films
1936 Western (genre) films
1930s historical films
Films set in the 1840s
American Western (genre) films
Films scored by Franz Waxman
American black-and-white films
Films set in California
Cultural depictions of Kit Carson
1930s English-language films
1930s American films
John Sutter